San Fermo Maggiore is a church built in Romanesque style in central Verona.

History
A church at this site may has been traced to the 8th century, and by the 11th century a second story and belltower was added by the Benedictine order. The campanile was not completed until the 13th century, it contains six bells in F cast in 1755 and rung with the Veronese bellringing art.  The exterior has a roofline with pinnacles, and the church once held the tomb of a member of the Scaligers. The interior has later decoration, including  an altarpiece of St Francis of Assisi by Giovanni Battista Belloti, whilst Veronese's Bevilacqua-Lazise Altarpiece was originally painted for a funerary chapel in the church. A crucifixion on the counter-façade is one of Turone's most significant works. The presbytery hosts relics of the saints Fermo and Rustico.

References

Fermo
Romanesque architecture in Verona
Gothic architecture in Verona
15th-century Roman Catholic church buildings in Italy